The Ambassador of Ireland to Canada is the head of the Embassy of Ireland, Ottawa, and the official representative of the Government of Ireland to the Government of Canada.

The incumbent Ambassador is Eamonn McKee who was appointed on 13 October 2020.

History

In 1929, the Irish Free State planned to open a diplomatic mission in Ottawa, but these plans were later shelved.

In 1939, Canada and Ireland opened High Commissions in each other's capital cities. The first and only High Commissioner of Ireland to the Dominion of Canada was John Hearne.

In 1949, the Republic of Ireland Act 1948 came into force and Ireland became a republic, leaving the Commonwealth. In 1950, Ireland appointed its first Ambassador of Ireland to Canada, Seán Murphy, as the High Commission was also converted into an embassy.

List of representatives

High Commissioner from Ireland to Canada (1939-1949)

1939–1949: John Hearne

Ambassadors from Ireland to Canada (1950–present)

1950–1955: Seán Murphy
1955–1956: Leo McCauley
1956–1960: Thomas Kiernan
1960–1964: William Fay
1964–1967: John Aloysius Belton
1967–1970: William Warnock
1970–1973: Joseph Shields
1974–1978: Paddy Power
1978–1983: Sean Kennan
1983–1988: Sean Gaynor
1988–1991: Edward Brennan
1991–1995: Antóin MacUnfraidh
1995–2001: Paul Dempsey
2001–2006: Martin Burke
2006–2010: Declan Kelly
2010–2016: Ray Bassett
2016–2020: Jim Kelly
2020-    : Eamonn McKee

See also

 Canada-Ireland relations

References 

 

Ireland and the Commonwealth of Nations
Canada
Ireland